Beausale is a hamlet and former civil parish, now in the parish of Beausale, Haseley, Honiley and Wroxall, in the Warwick district of Warwickshire, England, north-west of Warwick. According to the 2001 Census it had a population of 202. On 1 April 2007 the parish was abolished to form "Beausale, Haseley, Honiley and Wroxall".

References 

Villages in Warwickshire
Former civil parishes in Warwickshire
Warwick District